The Almeron Durkee House is a historic house located at 13 Cayuga Street (NY-90) in Union Springs, Cayuga County, New York.

Description and history 
It was built about 1820 and is a "remarkably intact" two-story, three-bay wide, side-hall stone dwelling in the Federal style. Attached to the main block are a -story wing and 1-story frame wing. Also on the property is a barn and stone smokehouse.

It was listed on the National Register of Historic Places on January 5, 2005.

It was deemed architecturally "significant as an outstanding example of early nineteenth century, Federal style domestic architecture in Union Springs. Built ca.1820, the house is an imposing and remarkably intact, two-story, three-bay, side-hall Federal style dwelling that embodies the building and decorative techniques popular in the Central and Finger Lakes regions of the state during the first quarter of the nineteenth century. Built of simply dressed blocks of locally quarried limestone laid in random courses, the Durkee house is a finely crafted vernacular adaptation of high style building trends in the region. The former farmhouse is complemented by two intact support buildings (a barn and a smokehouse) that survive from the property's use as a working farm."

The house is prominent upon the west side New York State Route 90, with a 2021-posted historic marker honoring a John Irving who lived in the house 1907-13.  Per the marker, he was a "schooner master and stonemason" who carved [quarried?] stone for early Cornell University buildings and the former Cornell library in Ithaca.

References

External links

Houses on the National Register of Historic Places in New York (state)
Federal architecture in New York (state)
Houses completed in 1820
Houses in Cayuga County, New York
Smokehouses
Union Springs, New York
National Register of Historic Places in Cayuga County, New York